"Get Out of Town" is a 1938 popular song written by Cole Porter, for his musical Leave It to Me!, where it was introduced by Tamara Drasin.

Notable recordings
Ginny Simms - recorded December 7, 1938 for Vocalion Records (catalog No. 4549).
Frances Langford - recorded December 14, 1938 for Decca Records (catalog No. 2229A).
Eddy Duchin and His Orchestra (vocal by Stanley Worth) - a popular record in 1939.
Artie Shaw and His Orchestra (vocal by Mel Torme) - recorded on  June 25, 1946, for Musicraft Records (catalog No. 389).
Maysa Matarazzo - recorded in 1959 for RGE - 45rpm (No. 90.000).
Steve Rochinski - A Bird In The Hand (1999)
Dena DeRose - Live at Jazz Standard, Volume 1 (2007)
Melody Gardot - Bye Bye Blackbird EP (2009)

References

Songs from Cole Porter musicals
1938 songs